Jochen Dries (born 24 February 1947) is a retired German football striker and later manager.

References

1947 births
Living people
German footballers
Borussia Neunkirchen players
1. FSV Mainz 05 players
Association football forwards
German football managers
Expatriate football managers in Switzerland
German expatriate sportspeople in Switzerland
Étoile Carouge FC managers
FC Sion managers
FC Aarau managers
FC Lausanne-Sport managers
SC Kriens managers